Babken Ludvig Melikyan (born 3 April 1960) is a professional football coach and former player who played as a midfielder or forward.

Born in Armenia, Melikyan moved to Lebanon in 1991, and obtained citizenship through naturalisation via a presidential decree in order to play for the Lebanon national team.

Managerial career 
Melikyan was Lebanon national team assistant coach to Richard Tardy, between 2002 and 2003.

Career statistics

International
Scores and results list Lebanon's goal tally first, score column indicates score after each Melikyan goal.

Honours

Player 
Ararat Yerevan
 IFA Shield: 1978

Dnepr Dnepropetrovsk
 USSR Federation Cup: 1986

Spartak Moscow
 Soviet Top League: 1987
 USSR Federation Cup: 1987

Homenmen Beirut
 Lebanese FA Cup runner-up: 1992–93, 1993–94, 1997–98

Sagesse
 Lebanese Second Division: 1998–99

Individual
 IFFHS All-time Lebanon Men's Dream Team
 Lebanese Premier League Team of the Season: 1996–97

Manager 
Sagesse
 Lebanese Second Division: 1998–99

See also
 List of Lebanon international footballers born outside Lebanon

References

External links
 
 
 

1960 births
Living people
Armenian footballers
Lebanese footballers
Soviet footballers
Armenian emigrants to Lebanon
Naturalized citizens of Lebanon
Footballers from Yerevan
Association football forwards
Association football midfielders
FC Ararat Yerevan players
SC Odesa players
FC Dnipro players
FC Spartak Moscow players
FC Kotayk Abovyan players
Homenmen Beirut players
Homenetmen Beirut footballers
Sagesse SC footballers
Soviet Armenians
Soviet Top League players
Lebanese Premier League players
Lebanon international footballers
Armenian football managers
Lebanese football managers
Sagesse SC football managers
Kilikia FC managers
Lebanese Premier League managers
Armenian Premier League managers
Lebanese Second Division players
Lebanese Second Division managers